Promenesta callichlora is a moth in the family Depressariidae. It was described by Edward Meyrick in 1915. It is found in Guyana.

The wingspan is about 13 mm. The forewings are violet grey with a large deep olive-green patch extending on the dorsum from the base to three-fourths and reaching three-fourths across the wing, its upper edge parallel to the costa, the posterior edge irregular. The costal area above this is suffused with whitish from the base to beyond one-third. There is a slender ferruginous costal streak from one-third, gradually dilated, towards the apex suffused with whitish and marked with two blackish marks, passing into a fine whitish terminal line, the extreme terminal edge black. The hindwings are blackish.

References

Moths described in 1915
Promenesta
Taxa named by Edward Meyrick